The 1952 Nemzeti Bajnokság I was the second season of the top level championship in the Hungarian team handball for women. Vörös Meteor completed their three match programme without defeat and won the title.

Results

Final standings

References
 Historical tables of the women's Nemzeti Bajnokság I

1952 in Hungarian sport
1952 in handball
1952
1952 in women's handball
1952 in Hungarian women's sport